Glenn Weiner (born April 27, 1976) is a former professional tennis player from the United States.

Career
Weiner won his first match on the ATP Tour in 1997, at the Infiniti Open, where he defeated Bob Bryan. Despite being ranked 280th in the world coming into the tournament, Weiner came close to beating the previous year's Wimbledon winner, Richard Krajicek, in the second round. He had four match points, but was unable to convert any of them and lost in a third set tie break. Just weeks later, Weiner upset world number 36 Thomas Johansson at Indianapolis.

In 2001 he was runner-up in the doubles at Newport, with André Sá. He also made the quarterfinals of the Heineken Open singles that year.

He defeated countryman Jeff Salzenstein in the 2004 Australian Open, the only time he reached the second round of a Grand Slam singles draw. He did however twice make the second round in the Wimbledon Men's Doubles.

ATP career finals

Doubles: 1 (0–1)

Challenger titles

Doubles: (11)

References

1976 births
Living people
American male tennis players
South African emigrants to the United States
Tennis players from Johannesburg
Tennis players from Long Beach, California